The Collection: Simon & Garfunkel is the fourth box set of Simon & Garfunkel recordings. Initially released November 15, 2004 as a 3-CD set of the second, fourth and fifth Simon & Garfunkel studio albums, it was later reissued November 26, 2007, expanded to six discs, including all five studio albums, plus a DVD of the September 19, 1981 free concert in Central Park. All six discs are in a mini-LP format and the albums come with the bonus tracks that were presented in The Columbia Studio Recordings (1964-1970). All of the discs in the 6-CD collection, and their cases, are housed in a box set featuring a silhouetted image of the duo with Paul Simon holding an acoustic guitar and Art Garfunkel sitting on a stool. The earlier 3-CD set had alternative artwork with a photo of the duo.

Track listing
All the following albums were included in the 6-CD box set, listed with their original release dates. Refer to each album page for track lists, personnel lists, and production credits.
 Wednesday Morning, 3 A.M. – October 1964
 Sounds of Silence – January 1966
 Parsley, Sage, Rosemary and Thyme – October 1966
 Bookends – April 1968
 Bridge over Troubled Water – January 1970
 The Concert in Central Park (DVD)

Producers: Tom Wilson, Bob Johnston, Paul Simon, Arthur Garfunkel, Roy Halee

2007 compilation albums
Simon & Garfunkel compilation albums
Simon & Garfunkel live albums
2007 live albums
2007 video albums
Live video albums
Albums produced by Tom Wilson (record producer)
Albums produced by Roy Halee
Albums produced by Bob Johnston
Albums produced by John Simon (record producer)
Columbia Records compilation albums
Columbia Records live albums
Columbia Records video albums
Albums produced by Paul Simon
Albums produced by Art Garfunkel